Nemanja Stjepanović (born 7 February 1984) is a Bosnian retired footballer who played as a midfielder. He last played for Bosnian Premier League club Tuzla City.

He holds both the Bosnian and Serbian citizenships.

Club career
After a spell abroad with Slovenian side Rudar Velenje he returned to Bosnia in 2015 to play for Sloboda Tuzla. He crossed town when he joined newly-promoted Sloga Simin Han in summer 2017.

Honours
Modriča 
Bosnian Premier League: 2007–08

Tuzla City
First League of FBiH: 2017–18

References

External links
PrvaLiga profile 

1984 births
Living people
People from Ljubovija
Association football midfielders
Bosnia and Herzegovina footballers
FK Modriča players
FK Laktaši players
HŠK Zrinjski Mostar players
FK Kozara Gradiška players
NK Rudar Velenje players
FK Sloboda Tuzla players
FK Tuzla City players
Premier League of Bosnia and Herzegovina players
Slovenian PrvaLiga players
Bosnia and Herzegovina expatriate footballers
Expatriate footballers in Slovenia
Bosnia and Herzegovina expatriate sportspeople in Slovenia